Weird Kids is the second studio album by American rock band We Are the In Crowd.

Production
Weird Kids was produced, mixing, and recorded by John Feldmann. Tommy English and Zakk Cervini did additional production and mixing; Joe Gastwirt mastered the album.

Composition
"Attention", according to Taylor Jardine, "is about friendship, and needing friends to help you see it’s okay to change for the better."

Release
On August 20, 2013, "Attention" was made available for streaming. In addition, a lyric video was also released. Later that month, the group performed three headlining shows in the UK, and appeared at the Reading and Leeds Festivals. Following this, they supported New Found Glory for a few shows in Europe. On December 3, Weird Kids was announced for release in February 2014. In addition, the album's track listing and artwork were revealed. A music video was released for "The Best Thing (That Never Happened)" on December 10, directed by Mark Staubach. A behind-the-scenes video followed five days later. On January 20, 2014, "Long Live the Kids" was made available for streaming. On January 27, "Windows in Heaven" was made available for streaming. In January and February, the group went on a UK tour with Neck Deep and Save Your Breathe.

"Manners" was made available for streaming on February 3. Weird Kids was made available for streaming via MTV on February 11, before being released on February 18 through independent label Hopeless Records. The group then embarked on a US tour between February and April, with William Beckett, Set It Off, State Champs and Candy Hearts. In April and May, the band supported Mayday Parade on their So Devastating, It’s Unnatural Tour in the US. Also in May, the band appeared at Slam Dunk Festival in the UK. Between June and August, the band went on Warped Tour. "Manners" was released to radio on August 4. On September 22, a music video was released for the track. The band supported New Found Glory on the Glamour Kills tour in October and November.

Reception

The album was included at number 45 on Rock Sounds "Top 50 Albums of the Year" list. The album was included at number 22 on Kerrang!s "The Top 50 Rock Albums Of 2014" list. "The Best Thing (That Never Happened)" was nominated for Best Single at the Kerrang! Awards.

Track listing
All songs written by We Are the In Crowd, additional composition by John Feldmann.

Personnel

We Are the In Crowd
 Taylor Jardine – lead vocals, backing vocals
 Jordan Eckes – guitar, co-lead vocals (3–7, 10, 11), backing vocals
 Mike Ferri – bass
 Cameron Hurley – guitar
 Rob Chianelli – drums

Additional musicians
 Tommy English – programming, backing vocals
 Zakk Cervini – backing vocals
 Alex Goot – additional piano (1)
 Tom Schleiter – additional guitars (2, 4)

Production and design
 John Feldmann – producer, mixing, recording
 Tommy English – engineer, additional production, mixing
 Zakk Cervini – 2nd engineer, additional production, mixing
 Joe Gastwirt – mastering
 Kevin Andersson – artwork, layout
 Matthew Reid – additional artwork

Charts

References
Citations

Sources

External links

Weird Kids at YouTube (streamed copy where licensed)

2014 albums
We Are the In Crowd albums
Hopeless Records albums
Albums produced by John Feldmann